David Krut is a noted art publisher and dealer  with a focus on artists  from South Africa. He is best known for his publication of the Taxi Art books and David Krut Projects.

Krut has played an influential role in promoting contemporary South African art and artists with a focus on editions  from David Krut workshop, arts education, and book publishing.  He represents a number of notable South African artists including  William Kentridge, Diane Victor, Stephen Hobbs, Deborah Bell., and Mongezi Ncaphayi.

He also represents the work of Ethiopian artist Aida Muluneh.

References

External links 

 http://davidkrutprojects.com/
 http://davidkrutbookstores.com/

Living people
South African publishers (people)
Year of birth missing (living people)